In Greek mythology, Ctesius (Ancient Greek: Κτήσιος means 'belonging to property, acquisition') may refer to three distinct characters:

 Ctesius, king of the island called Syria and son of Ormenus. He was the father of Eumaeus.
 Ctesius, one of the Suitors of Penelope who came from Dulichium along with other 56 wooers. He, with the other suitors, was slain by Odysseus with the aid of Eumaeus, Philoetius, and Telemachus.
 Ctesius or Ktesios, minor god of household.

Notes

References 

 Apollodorus, The Library with an English Translation by Sir James George Frazer, F.B.A., F.R.S. in 2 Volumes, Cambridge, MA, Harvard University Press; London, William Heinemann Ltd. 1921. ISBN 0-674-99135-4. Online version at the Perseus Digital Library. Greek text available from the same website.
 Homer, The Odyssey with an English Translation by A.T. Murray, Ph.D. in two volumes. Cambridge, MA., Harvard University Press; London, William Heinemann, Ltd. 1919. . Online version at the Perseus Digital Library. Greek text available from the same website.

Suitors of Penelope
Characters in the Odyssey